Dancer is a song by Gino Soccio. It was released as a single in 1979 from his album Outline.

The song topped the Billboard Disco chart and remained on that spot for six weeks. It was also Soccio's only Billboard Hot 100 entry, peaking at No. 48, and his only Top 10 hit on his home country's RPM Top Singles chart, peaking at No. 6.

The song was part of the playlist at New York City disco Paradise Garage, in an extended mix by DJ Larry Levan. “They would play that song three times in a row sometimes, and it was already an eight-minute song," Soccio told Wax Poetics in a 2013 career retrospective interview. "It was twenty-four minutes of ‘Dancer,’ and people just would not get enough of it. It really was something. It blew me away.”

During Pride Month 2022, "Dancer" was selected by Jezebel as #22 in their list of "69 of the Best Disco Songs of All Time."

Chart performance

References

1979 singles
1979 songs
Disco songs
Warner Records singles